The 1989 Tokyo Indoor, also known by its sponsored  name Seiko Super Tennis, was a men's tennis tournament played on indoor carpet courts at the Yoyogi National Gymnasium in Tokyo, Japan that was part of the 1989 Nabisco Grand Prix. The tournament was held from 18 October through 23 October 1989. It was a major tournament of the Grand Prix tennis circuit and  matches were the best of three sets.

Finals

Singles

 Aaron Krickstein defeated  Carl Uwe Steeb 6–2, 6–2
 It was Krickstein's 3rd singles title of the year and the 7th of his career.

Doubles

 Kevin Curren /  David Pate defeated  Andrés Gómez /  Slobodan Živojinović 4–6, 6–3, 7–6

References

External links
 ITF tournament edition details

Tokyo Indoor
Tokyo Indoor
Tokyo Indoor